The 2016 Shohada Cup was the 2nd edition friendly football tournament; it took place in Shahr-e Qods, Iran in January 2016.

Participating teams
Totally 4 teams get permission to participate in the tournament "2016 Shohada Cup". 
 Persepolis from ( Iran)
 Saba Qom from ( Iran)
 Saipa from ( Iran)
 Zob Ahan from ( Iran)

Matches

First round

Play-off

Final

Statistics

Top Scorers

Shohada